Perry Township is one of fifteen townships in Wayne County, Indiana, United States. As of the 2010 census, its population was 835 and it contained 325 housing units.

History
Perry Township was originally settled chiefly by Quakers.

Geography
Lakes in this township include Osborne Lakes. The streams of Economy Run, Jordon Creek, Mop Run, Swab Creek, Wash Branch and West Brook run through this township.

Cities and towns
 Economy

Adjacent townships
 Union Township, Randolph County (north)
 Green Township (east)
 Clay Township (southeast)
 Jefferson Township (southwest)
 Dalton Township (west)

Cemeteries
The township contains two cemeteries: Economy and Jordon.

Major highways
 U.S. Route 35

References
 U.S. Board on Geographic Names (GNIS)
 United States Census Bureau cartographic boundary files

External links
 Indiana Township Association
 United Township Association of Indiana

Townships in Wayne County, Indiana
Townships in Indiana